James Atwater Contner (born June 12, 1947) is an American film, television director and cinematographer. His work includes episodes of such television series as Miami Vice, Angel, Buffy the Vampire Slayer, Firefly, The X-Files and Star Trek: Enterprise. He has also directed several films, including One Hot Summer Night (1998), and Shark Swarm (2008).

References

External links

1947 births
American cinematographers
American film directors
American film producers
American television directors
American television producers
Living people
Place of birth missing (living people)